A/S Kosmos was a shipping and industrial company from Sandefjord.

It was founded in 1928 by Anders Jahre, Svend Foyn Bruun, Sr. and Anton Barth von der Lippe as Hvalfangstselskapet Kosmos A/S. In 1949 Hvalfangstselskapet Kosmos A/S (A/S Kosmos) and its sister company Hvalfangstselskapet Kosmos II A/S (A/S Kosmos II) were fused to make the company A/S Kosmos.

In 1986, the brothers Arne and Wilhelm Blystad sought to take control of the company, without luck. Two other brothers, Morits and Brynjulf Skaugen, Jr., took control of Kosmos two years later, and split up the company. The shipping arm of the company was taken over by I. M. Skaugen and Color Line.

From 1978 to 1989, Bjørn Bettum was the administrative director of Kosmos.

See also 
FLK Kosmos, whaling ship
FLK Kosmos II, whaling ship

References

Further reading
Lardex.net: Kosmos 50 years ago
Kosmos' home page
Alf R. Jacobsen (1986) Kampen om Kosmos, Pax, Oslo. 
Odd Thorson (1953) Aksjeselskapet Kosmos gjennom 25 år. En epoke i Antarktis, Dreyer, Oslo

Defunct shipping companies of Norway
Transport companies established in 1928
1928 establishments in Norway
Transport companies disestablished in 1988
Companies based in Sandefjord
Manufacturing companies established in 1928